Olle Sundin (born 17 December 1997) is a retired Swedish World Cup alpine ski racer.

World Cup results

Results per discipline

 standings through 8 February 2021

World Championship results

Other results

European Cup results

Season standings

Results per discipline

Standings through 31 January 2021

Race podiums
 1 podiums – (1 DH)

References

External links
 
 

Swedish male alpine skiers
1997 births
Living people
21st-century Swedish people